= Monatshefte für Chemie =

- Discipline: Chemistry
- Language: English
- Edited by: Peter Gärtner

Publication details
- History: 1880–present
- Publisher: Springer Science+Business Media (Austria)
- Frequency: Monthly
- Impact factor: 1.613 (2021)

Standard abbreviations
- ISO 4: Monatsh. Chem.

Indexing
- ISSN: 1434-4475

Links
- Journal homepage

Monatshefte für Chemie - Chemical Monthly is a journal covering recent research from all branches of chemistry. It was originally conceived as an Austrian journal, but has evolved into an international journal covering all branches of chemistry.
